Ingram Branch is an unincorporated community located  in Fayette County, West Virginia, United States.

The community took its name from nearby Ingram Branch, a creek which was named after James Ingram, a pioneer settler.

Gallery

References 

Unincorporated communities in West Virginia
Unincorporated communities in Fayette County, West Virginia
Coal towns in West Virginia